McCammon is a surname. Notable people with the surname include:

Bob McCammon (born 1941), Canadian ice hockey player
Catherine McCammon, American geologist
J. Andrew McCammon (born 1947), American chemist and academic
John McCammon, Irish bicycle inventor
Kurt A. McCammon, American urologist
Mark McCammon (born 1978), English-born Barbadian footballer
Mary McCammon (circa 1928 – 2008), British mathematician
Morgan McCammon (1922-1999), Canadian lawyer and businessman
Robert R. McCammon (born 1952), American novelist
William W. McCammon (1838-1903), American Civil War Union Army officer

See also
McCammon, Idaho, city in Idaho, United States
Samuel McCammon House, historic home in Knoxville, Tennessee